is a Paralympic swimmer from Japan competing mainly in category  events.

Career
Takayuki was part of the Japanese contingent as two Paralympics, 2004 Summer Paralympics and the 2008 Summer Paralympics.  In 2004 he was part of the Japanese squad that won a silver in the 4x50m medley behind a new Paralympic record set by the Brazilian team, he was also part of the squad that finished fourth in the 4x50m freestyle.  Individually he finished eighth in the individual medley and seventh in the 100m freestyle.  At the 2008 games Takayuki set a new world record in the heats of the 50m breaststroke going on to win the gold medal in the final, he also won a bronze in the 150m individual medley, he finished eighth in the 200m freestyle, seventh in the 100m freestyle but failed to make the final of the 50m freestyle.

References

External links
 

Year of birth missing (living people)
Living people
Japanese male breaststroke swimmers
Japanese male freestyle swimmers
Japanese male medley swimmers
Paralympic swimmers of Japan
S5-classified Paralympic swimmers
Paralympic gold medalists for Japan
Paralympic silver medalists for Japan
Paralympic bronze medalists for Japan
Paralympic medalists in swimming
Swimmers at the 2004 Summer Paralympics
Swimmers at the 2008 Summer Paralympics
Swimmers at the 2012 Summer Paralympics
Medalists at the 2004 Summer Paralympics
Medalists at the 2008 Summer Paralympics
Medalists at the 2012 Summer Paralympics
Medalists at the 2020 Summer Paralympics
Medalists at the World Para Swimming Championships
Swimmers at the 2020 Summer Paralympics
21st-century Japanese people
Medalists at the 2018 Asian Para Games